Northern Gateway can refer to:
Enbridge Northern Gateway Pipelines, a Canadian pipeline project
Northern Gateway Regional Division No. 10, a school board in Alberta.
Auckland Northern Motorway, a New Zealand toll road
The Northern Gateway, an antebellum trade route connecting the Midwestern and Atlantic United States
Northern Gateway Roundabout, a roundabout in Kingston upon Hull

The gateway to the north can refer to
Edmonton, Alberta
The Pas, Manitoba
Prince Albert, Saskatchewan